Deloss Barnum (1825–1873) was a photographer in New York and Boston, Massachusetts in the mid-19th century. Around 1857 he kept a daguerreotype studio on Winter Street in Boston; by 1858 he had moved to Commercial Street. In 1856-1860 he lived in Roxbury.  He participated in the 1860 exhibition of the Massachusetts Charitable Mechanic Association. He died October 7, 1873 in Cortland, New York.

During his career he was referred to by several variant names: D. Barnum;  Deblois Barnum; Delos Barnum; DeLos Barnum; and Deloss Barnum.

References

External links

 Library of Congress. Sunnyside, home of Washington Irving, NY.
 New York Public Library has many stereoscope images by D. Barnum.
  (includes info related to Barnum)

Image gallery
Photographs by Deloss Barnum

Pioneers of photography
1825 births
1873 deaths
Photographers from New York (state)
Artists from Boston
19th-century American photographers